The Type 73 is a light machine gun designed and manufactured by North Korea's First Machine Industry Bureau. It is used primarily by the Korean People's Army, and via Iran, has been exported throughout the Middle East. It has a passing resemblance to the Bren light machine gun.

History
The Type 73 is based on a 1960s-era Soviet design, most likely the PK machine gun (PKM), although the date of its first production in North Korea is currently unknown. The weapon was reportedly seen in the Korean Demilitarized Zone in 2002, when a United Nations Command Military Armistice Commission team told media outlets that North Korean soldiers had set up numerous Type 73s in positions 100 to 400 meters north of the demarcation line. The weapons were reportedly removed at the end of each day.

Due to the North Korean government's policy of secrecy, information on the weapon is hard to obtain. One example has been acquired by South Korea. North Korean officials were apparently not satisfied with the weapon, and by 1982 they had developed the Type 82 machine gun, which was more directly copied from the PKM's design.  This seemed to replace the Type 73 in front-line service, as it was seen in use less since the early-1980s, though it was possibly moved to reserve or militia service. Many were supplied to Iran during the Iran–Iraq War, and some of these have in turn been supplied to Iranian-backed groups engaged in fighting the Islamic State of Iraq and the Levant (ISIL).

Since mid-2015, North Korean or Iranian-built copies of belt-fed Type 73s have been seen in use by Iranian-supported militias like the Popular Mobilization Forces, as well as other factions including the Christian Babylon Brigades that acquired the weapons through their alliance against ISIS.  By early 2016, they were being used in Syria and by Houthi rebels in Yemen.

Design
The design is heavily based on the 1960s-era Soviet PK machine gun. However, the Type 73 does have certain indigenous modifications, including removable muzzle sleeves and a dual magazine/belt feed system, patterned after the Czechoslovak Vz.52 LMG, allowing the user to fire the weapon from indigenous box magazines or ammunition belts that can used with the PKM. One unusual feature is a special barrel attachment to enable the gun to fire rifle grenades.

The weapon's intended combat role is thought to be as a squad automatic weapon. However, it uses a 7.62×54mmR cartridge, not the 7.62×39mm round used by the Type 58 assault rifle, North Korea's standard infantry rifle.

This is unusual as most armies' squad automatic weapons use the same ammunition as rifles, so all members of a unit may share ammunition and only one type needs to be supplied. A larger cartridge is a characteristic of a general-purpose machine gun, although such weapons typically are belt fed and do not use a box magazine.

Users
 
 : Popular Mobilization Forces
 
 : Syrian Arab Army

Non-State Actors
 
 Islamic State

See also
 Type 67 machine gun

References

Bibliography
 

7.62×54mmR machine guns
Light machine guns
Firearms of North Korea
Military equipment introduced in the 1970s